Sportsko privredno društvo Radnički, commonly abbreviated as SPD Radnički, is a company and multi-sport club based in Kragujevac, Serbia. There are currently four men's and three women's teams within the club.

Clubs
The following is a list of sport clubs owned by SPD Radnički:

References

External links
 

 
Sport in Kragujevac
Multi-sport clubs in Serbia
2019 establishments in Serbia
Sports clubs established in 2019